D. Francisco Antonio of Braganza, Prince of Beira (21 March 1795 – 11 June 1801) was the first son of D. João Maria and D. Carlota Joaquina, the Prince and Princess of Brazil.

The Prince was born on 21 March 1795, and was titled the Prince of Beira and the Duke of Barcelos, as heir-apparent to the heir-apparent of the throne of Portugal.  Antonio Francisco died on 11 June 1801, at the age of six, passing his title as Prince of Beira to his younger brother, the Infante D. Pedro de Alcântara.

Honours 
  Knight of the Order of the Golden Fleece (Kingdom of Spain).

See also 
Descendants of John VI of Portugal

References

House of Braganza
Princes of Beira
Portuguese infantes
People from Lisbon
1795 births
1801 deaths
18th-century Portuguese people
19th-century Portuguese people
Knights of the Golden Fleece of Spain
Burials at the Monastery of São Vicente de Fora
Sons of emperors
Sons of kings
Royalty and nobility who died as children